Dysoptus spilacris is a species of moth in the family Arrhenophanidae. It is common in both primary and secondary forests in La Selva, Costa Rica. It also has been found in the adjacent Braulio Carrillo National Park and in the Mexican state of Veracruz.

The length of the forewings is 4-5.6 mm for males and about 8.8 mm for females. Adults have been collected every month of the year except August and September at La Selva, Costa Rica.

Etymology

External links
Family Arrhenophanidae

Dysoptus
Taxa named by Donald R. Davis (entomologist)
Moths described in 2003